Queens Wharf is a multi-purpose venue in Newcastle, New South Wales, Australia with a cafe, pub, restaurant, observation tower and ferry wharf built as part of the redevelopment of the Hunter River foreshore. Opened in May 1988 by Queen Elizabeth II, it was completed as a Bicentennial project.  The Queens Wharf project was the vision of Joy Cummings, who became Lord Mayor of Newcastle in 1974, the first woman ever to hold such a position in Australia.

The observation tower was demolished in September 2018. The decision to  keep the observation tower would cost ratepayers $1.6 million in the next four years in maintenance costs. The total cost of demolition  was estimated to cost $30,000.

The ferry wharf is served by Newcastle Transport's Stockton ferry service.

The wharf also has a stop on the Newcastle Light Rail.

References

External links
Queens Wharf details Transport for NSW

Buildings and structures completed in 1988
Buildings and structures in Newcastle, New South Wales
Observation towers in Australia
Towers completed in 1988
Transport infrastructure completed in 1988
Wharves in Australia
1988 establishments in Australia
Demolished buildings and structures in New South Wales
Buildings and structures demolished in 2018